Lysette is an English feminine given name, a variant of Lisette. The meaning of the name is "Consecrated to God" or "God is My Oath". It may refer to:

 Lysette Anthony (born 1963), an English actress and model 
 Lysette Brochu (born 1946), a French-Canadian writer

See also
 Trace Lysette, an American actress 

Feminine given names
English feminine given names